Tuff is both a given name and a surname. Notable people with the name include:

 Tuf Borland (born 1998), American football player
 Tuff Harris (born 1983), American football player
 Tuff Hedeman (born 1963), American rodeo performer
 Stein Henrik Tuff (born 1974), Norwegian ski jumper